Caernarfonshire, sometimes spelled Caernarvonshire or Carnarvonshire, is one of the thirteen historic counties, a vice-county and a former administrative county of Wales.

Geography
The county is bounded to the north by the Irish Sea, to the east by Denbighshire, to the south by Cardigan Bay and Merionethshire, and to the west by Caernarfon Bay and the Menai Strait, separating it from Anglesey.

The county has a largely mountainous surface. A large part of the Snowdonian Range lies in the centre and south-east of the county, including Snowdon itself, the highest mountain in Wales at 1,085 m (3,560 ft). The south-west of the county is formed by the Llŷn peninsula, with Bardsey Island lying off its western end. The north of the county, between the mountains and Menai Strait, has much more subdued relief. The east of the county is part of Vale of Conwy, with the River Conwy forming much of the eastern boundary. Llandudno and Creuddyn forms a small peninsula to the north-east across the Conwy estuary.

The counties includes the city of Bangor and the towns and villages of Betws-y-Coed, Caernarfon, Conwy, Llandudno, Porthmadog and Pwllheli.

History

Creation
The county was originally created under the terms of the Statute of Rhuddlan in 1284 following Edward I of England's conquest of the Principality of Wales and included the cantrefi of: Llŷn, Arfon, Arllechwedd and the commote of Eifionydd (the northern portion of Dunoding).

The county was divided into ten hundreds based on the existing Welsh commotes: Cymydmaen (anglicised as Commitmaen), Creuddyn, Dinllaen, Eifionydd (Evionydd), Cafflogion (Gaflogion), Llechwedd Isaf (...Isav), Llechwedd Uchaf (...Uchav), Nant Conwy (Nant-Conway), Is Gwyrfai (Isgorvai) and Uwch Gwyrfai (Uchgorvai).

19th and 20th centuries
During the 19th century the population increased steadily, from 46,000 in the 1801 census, to 81,093 in 1841, and up to 137,000 in the 1901 census (figures given for the registration county).

Governance

Under the Local Government Act 1888, an elected Carnarvonshire County Council taking over functions from the county's quarter sessions. The administrative county covered by the county council had identical borders to the geographic county. The administrative county was formally renamed Caernarvonshire on 1 July 1926. The county council was based at County Hall, Caernarfon.

The county contained five ancient boroughs. Two of these (Caernarfon and Pwllheli) were reformed in 1835 by the Municipal Corporations Act. Criccieth established a special body of commissioners in 1873. Conwy (then called Conway in English) was reformed to become a municipal borough in 1877. The remaining borough, the City of Bangor was not reformed until 1883.

Under the Public Health Act 1848 and the Local Government Act 1858 a number of towns were created Local Board Districts or Local Government Districts respectively, with local boards to govern their areas. Other towns became Improvement Commissioners' Districts by private act of parliament. In 1872 these, along with the municipal boroughs, became urban sanitary districts. At the same time the remainder of the county was divided into rural sanitary districts, some of which crossed county boundaries. The Local Government Act 1894 redesignated these as urban and rural districts. A county review order in 1934 made changes to the county's districts.

The civil parish of Llysfaen was a detached exclave of the county.  On 1 April 1923 Llysfaen was transferred to the county of Denbighshire.

Under the Local Government Act 1972 the administrative county of Caernarvonshire was abolished on 1 April 1974. It was largely split between the three districts of Aberconwy, Arfon and Dwyfor of Gwynedd (along with Merionethshire and Anglesey). The administrative entity of Caernarfonshire was very briefly revived in 1996, when the unitary area of Caernarfonshire and Merionethshire was created. It was, however, renamed Gwynedd almost immediately. Since then Caernarfonshire has been divided between the unitary authorities of Gwynedd to the west and Conwy to the east.

Coat of arms
Caernarvonshire County Council received a grant of armorial bearings from the College of Arms in 1949. The shield was a combination of the arms of two great native Princes of Wales. The gold and red quarters bearing lions were the arms of Llewelyn the Last – now used as the arms of the Principality of Wales. Across this was placed a green fess or horizontal band, on which were three gold eagles, from the arms of Owain Gwynedd. According to the poet Michael Drayton, the eagles formed the device on the banner of the Caernarvonshire soldiers at the Battle of Agincourt. The crest above the shield was a generic castle, representing Caernarfon, Conwy and Criccieth Castles. Behind the castle was the badge of the heir apparent: three ostrich feathers. The supporters were Welsh dragons with fish tails to show that Caernarvonshire was a Welsh maritime county. The supporter stood on a compartment of rocks for the rugged coast and mountains of the county. The motto Cadernid Gwynedd was adopted by the county council. This was derived from the Mabinogion, and can be translated as "The Strength of Gwynedd".

Flag
The Flag of Caernarfonshire was registered with the Flag Institute in March 2012. The pattern of three gold eagles on a green background is a design with a long association with the county, having reputedly been flown by Caernarfonshire soldiers at the Battle of Agincourt in 1415.

Places of interest
Bangor Cathedral
Ynys Enlli / Bardsey Island;
Caernarfon Castle;
Conwy Castle; 
Criccieth Castle; 
Great Orme Tramway; 
Gwydir Castle, nr. Llanrwst; 
Penrhyn Castle; 
Swallow Falls, Betws-y-Coed; 
Snowdon Mountain Railway, Llanberis; 
Ty Mawr Wybrnant.

See also
Lord Lieutenant of Carnarvonshire – chronological list of Lords Lieutenant of Caernarvonshire
List of High Sheriffs of Caernarvonshire
Custos Rotulorum of Caernarvonshire – chronological list of Custodes rotulorum of Caernarvonshire
Sheriff of Caernarvonshire – chronological list of Sheriffs of Caenarvonshire
Caernarvonshire (UK Parliament constituency) – chronological list of MPs for former Caernarvonshire constituency
Unitary Authorities of Wales

References

Bibliography
A.H. Dodd, The History of Caernarvonshire (Caernarfonshire Historical Society, 1968).
John Jones, Enwau Lleoedd Sir Gaernarfon (Caernarfon, 1913). Origin and meanings of place names in the county.

External links

Map of Caernarfonshire on Wikishire
The Caernarfonshire Association

Caernarfonshire
History of Gwynedd
Historic counties of Wales
States and territories established in 1284
1280s establishments in Europe
13th century in Wales
 01